Statistics of Empress's Cup in the 1983 season.

Overview
It was contested by 16 teams, and Shimizudaihachi SC won the championship.

Results

1st Round
FC Jinnan 8-0 Mikaho Reebons
Takakura Junior High School 4-0 Fujieda Sisters FC
FC Kodaira 7-0 Shimizu FC Mama
Chiba Gakuen High School 0-4 Takatsuki FC
Yomiuri SC Beleza 5-0 Uwajima Minami High School
Mitsubishi Heavy Industries 0-4 Kobe FC
Nishiyama Club 4-0 Ichinomiya Graces
Ryuhoku Club 0-10 Shimizudaihachi SC

Quarterfinals
FC Jinnan 3-0 Takakura Junior High School
FC Kodaira 0-3 Takatsuki FC
Yomiuri SC Beleza 4-3 Kobe FC
Nishiyama Club 0-4 Shimizudaihachi SC

Semifinals
FC Jinnan 0-1 Takatsuki FC
Yomiuri SC Beleza 0-5 Shimizudaihachi SC

Final
Takatsuki FC 0-2 Shimizudaihachi SC
Shimizudaihachi SC won the championship.

References

Empress's Cup
1983 in Japanese women's football